Hopkins Pond is a park in Haddonfield, Camden County, New Jersey in the United States.

The park includes Hopkins Pond, Driscoll Pond, and the surrounding land, maintained by the Camden County Parks Commission.

There is a large earthen dam, around 20 feet high, with Hopkins Lane on top.  Below it is Driscoll Pond. It is notable that both ponds are deep for their small size, with Hopkins Pond reportedly being over ten feet deep at its center, and having places where the bottom is around 30 feet deep. Driscoll Pond's bottom also goes out of sight very quickly along its edge. The pond empties into the Cooper River.

References

External links
 

Haddonfield, New Jersey
Parks in Camden County, New Jersey
County parks in New Jersey